This is a complete list of Azerbaijani futsallers.

B 
 Rufat Balakishiyev
 Biro Jade
 Vitaliy Borisov

D 
 Jadder Dantas

F 
 Rajab Farajzade 
 Rizvan Farzaliyev

H 
 Ilkin Hajiyev

M 
 Namig Mammadkarimov

P 
 Thiago Gabriel Rodrigues Paz

S 
 Marat Salyanski 
 Felipe Ribeiro dos Santos
 Serjão 
 Edigleuson Alves de Sousa

T 
 Andrey Tveryankin

 
Futsal players